A men's and women's cashspiel, or curling tournament is held at the CFB Halifax Curling Club In Halifax, Nova Scotia every October. The women's event is called the New Scotland Clothing Ladies Cashspiel and the men's event is called the New Scotland Brewing Men's Cash Spiel. The men's event was called the Bud Light Men's Cashspiel until 2019.

Past Champions

Men

Women

References

Women's curling competitions in Canada
Curling competitions in Halifax, Nova Scotia
2015 in Nova Scotia